Hubert Hurkacz was the reigning champion from when the tournament was last held in 2019, but chose not to participate this year.

Ilya Ivashka won his maiden ATP Tour title, defeating Mikael Ymer in the final, 6–0, 6–2. Ivashka became the first Belarusian man to win an ATP singles title since Max Mirnyi in 2003, while Ymer became the first Swedish man to reach an ATP singles final since Robin Söderling in 2011.

Seeds
All seeds receive a bye into the second round.

Draw

Finals

Top half

Section 1

Section 2

Bottom half

Section 3

Section 4

Qualifying

Seeds

Qualifiers

Lucky losers

Qualifying draw

First qualifier

Second qualifier

Third qualifier

Fourth qualifier

References

External links
Main draw
Qualifying draw

2021 ATP Tour
2021 Singles